The San Diego Sting was a women's professional football team of the Women's Football Alliance that started in 2010.  Based in San Diego, California, the Sting plays its home games in nearby Carlsbad at Carlsbad High School.

The Sting was one of two San Diego teams in the WFA, the other one being the San Diego Surge. The Sting ceased operations after the 2012 season.

Season-By-Season

|-
|2010 || 0 || 8 || 0 || 4th American South Pacific || --
|-
|2011 || 1 || 7 || 0 || 4th American Southwest || --
|-
|2012* || 1 || 2 || 0 || 2nd WFA American 15 || --
|-
!Totals || 2 || 17 || 0

* = Current standing

2011 roster

2010

Season Schedule

** = Forfeited

2011

Standings

Season Schedule

2012

Season schedule

External links 
San Diego Sting website
Women's Football Alliance website

Women's Football Alliance teams
American football teams in San Diego
American football teams established in 2010
Carlsbad, California
2010 establishments in California
Women's sports in California